This is a list of municipalities in South Holland. South Holland is divided into 50 municipalities.

Table

Municipal reorganisations
Since 1840, South Holland has ceded five municipalities to the province of Utrecht: Oudewater in 1970, Woerden in 1989, Vianen in 2002, Leerdam and Zederik in 2019.

Municipal reorganisations since 2000:

 On 1 January 2002 the municipalities of Pijnacker and Nootdorp were merged into the new municipality of Pijnacker-Nootdorp.
 On 1 January 2002 the municipalities of Leidschendam and Voorburg were merged into the new municipality of Leidschendam-Voorburg.
 On 1 January 2002 the municipality of Vianen became a part of the province of Utrecht.
 On 1 January 2003 the municipality of Heerjansdam was merged into the existing municipality of Zwijndrecht.
 On 1 January 2004 the municipalities of De Lier, 's-Gravenzande, Monster, Naaldwijk and Wateringen were merged into the new municipality of Westland
 On 1 January 2004 the municipalities of Maasland and Schipluiden were merged into the new municipality of Midden-Delfland.
 On 1 January 2006 the municipalities of Sassenheim, Voorhout and Warmond were merged into the new municipality of Teylingen.
 On 1 January 2006 the municipalities of Rijnsburg and Valkenburg were merged into the existing municipality of Katwijk.
 On 1 January 2007 the municipalities of Liemeer and Ter Aar were merged into the existing municipality of Nieuwkoop.
 On 1 January 2007 the municipalities of Bergschenhoek, Berkel en Rodenrijs and Bleiswijk were merged into the new municipality of Lansingerland.
 On 1 January 2007 the municipality of 's-Gravendeel was merged into the existing municipality of Binnenmaas.
 On 1 January 2009 the municipalities of Alkemade and Jacobswoude were merged into the new municipality of Kaag en Braassem.
 On 1 January 2010 the municipalities of Moordrecht, Nieuwerkerk aan den IJssel and Zevenhuizen-Moerkapelle were merged into the new municipality of Zuidplas.
 On 18 March 2010 the municipality of Rozenburg was merged into the existing municipality of Rotterdam.
 On 1 January 2011 the municipalities of Bodegraven and Reeuwijk were merged into the new municipality of Bodegraven-Reeuwijk.
 On 1 January 2013 the municipalities of Graafstroom, Liesveld and Nieuw-Lekkerland were merged into the new municipality of Molenwaard.
 On 1 January 2013 the municipalities of Dirksland, Goedereede, Middelharnis and Oostflakkee were merged into the new municipality of Goeree-Overflakkee.
 On 1 January 2014 the municipalities of Boskoop and Rijnwoude were merged into the existing municipality of Alphen aan den Rijn.
 On 1 January 2015 the municipalities of Bergambacht, Nederlek, Ouderkerk, Schoonhoven and Vlist were merged into Krimpenerwaard.
 On 1 January 2015 the municipalities of Bernisse and Spijkenisse were merged into Nissewaard.
 On 1 January 2019 the municipalities of Binnenmaas, Cromstrijen, Korendijk, Oud-Beijerland and Strijen were merged into Hoeksche Waard.
 On 1 January 2019 the municipalities of Giessenlanden and Molenwaard were merged into the new municipality of Molenlanden.
 On 1 January 2019 the municipality of Noordwijkerhout was merged into the existing municipality of Noordwijk.
 On 1 January 2019 the municipalities of Leerdam, Zederik and Vianen (Utrecht) were merged into the new municipality of Vijfheerenlanden. This municipality was added to the province of Utrecht.
 On 1 January 2023 the municipalities of Brielle, Hellevoetsluis and Westvoorne were merged into the new municipality of Voorne aan Zee.

See also
 List of cities, towns and villages in South Holland

References 
 Statistics Netherlands, http://www.cbs.nl

 
South Holland
 
Municipalities, South Holland